Nightmare Ned is an American animated television series which ran from April 19 to July 5, 1997, on ABC. The show was produced by Walt Disney Television Animation and Creative Capers Entertainment, and created by Terry Shakespeare, G. Sue Shakespeare, and David Molina of Creative Capers Entertainment. The show was based on and developed alongside the computer game of the same name, however, the show ended up being completed before the video game was released.

The show focuses on the life of Ned Needlemeyer (voiced by Courtland Mead), an 8-year-old boy that deals with his daily problems through dark, quirky nightmares.

The show received mixed reviews from critics. The Chicago Tribune praised the show's art style but was critical of its subject matter. Similarly, Screen Rant described the show as "dark and even disturbing" and "mainly an excuse for Disney animators to show off their strange side". However, the show did receive praise from TV Guide. The show only aired once and was never re-released, being described as a "great oddity of the Disney Studio's television output" which was "largely disowned".

Characters
Ned Needlemeyer (voiced by Courtland Mead): The show's protagonist. He is an 8-year-old boy who deals with his troubles through his nightmares.
Ed Needlemeyer (voiced by Brad Garrett): Ned's father, who tries to help Ned with his problems, but this does not occur often.
Sarah Needlemeyer (voiced by Victoria Jackson): Ned's mother, who is the only one in the family who tries to understand Ned's nightmares.
Amy Needlemeyer (voiced by Kath Soucie): Ned's baby sister.
Conrad and Vernon (voiced by Jeff Bennett and Rob Paulsen respectively): Two bullies who constantly pick on Ned. Conrad is heavyset with blue skin, and has a snaggletooth, whereas Vernon is tall with yellow skin and is often barefoot. They are named after Conrad Vernon, who served as one of the storyboard artists of the show.
Ms. Bundt (voiced by Tress MacNeille): Ned's teacher.
Joanie (voiced by Aria Curzon): A girl from Ned's school who has a crush on him. She appears in the episodes "Until Undeath Do Us Part" and briefly in "Girl Trouble".

Production
The Nightmare Ned television show was developed alongside the computer game of the same name. Donovan Cook described the collaboration: "There's some crossover. We sent them our graphics. [...] We had to have our art done right away and they ended up influenced by it along the way." 

The series was initially planned for only one season with the potential to return as a 1998 mid-season replacement. However, due to production difficulties, the show was not continued after its 12-episode first season. The show ran over budget and there were creative differences between Donovan Cook, the producer and director of the show, and Walt Dohrn, the developer and also a director of the show.

Episodes

Video game

Nightmare Ned is a computer game for Microsoft Windows that was developed alongside the animated series. The game was based on a concept by Sue and Terry Shakespeare. It was initially planned for a September 2, 1997 release – however, this release date was evidently pushed back based on the most recent files on the CD-ROM being dated September 16; it was eventually released on October 7. Developed by Creative Capers Entertainment and Window Painters Ltd. and published by Disney Interactive Studios, the game was Disney Interactive's first video game release that was developed by a subcontracted developer. An unlicensed localization by Fargus Multimedia was released in Russia in late 1999 under the name Один дома: Ночные кошмарики (Odin doma: Nochnye koshmariki; Russian for "Alone at Home: Nightly Nightmares").  

Unlike the TV series, the animation in the game used digital ink and paint. It was designed to take advantage of  Intel MMX technology. Nightmare Ned was the first CD-ROM to use full-motion video streaming technology. Much of the same voice cast from the show was also utilized for the video game. The game was promoted through print ads, advertisements on Disney VHS releases, and an online campaign on Yahooligans!. Sequels for the game were planned but were never released.

Gameplay
The game features Ned traveling through adventure portals into five different nightmare worlds: Ned's Graveyard Nightmare, Ned's School Nightmare, Ned's Medical Nightmare, Ned's Nightmare in the Attic, Basement and Beyond, and Ned's Bathroom Nightmare. Each portal has a corresponding representative "shadow creature" that, through exploration of the world, eventually reveals itself to be someone or something harmless. The game generally features a sidescrolling interface, but utilizes multiple layers to create depth. Ned's yo-yo serves as the main weapon against enemies.

Reception
The Nightmare Ned video game was critically acclaimed and was nominated for two CODiE awards. In 1998, it received a Parents' Choice Award. In June 1998, it received a silver award from I.D. Magazine. In October 1998, it received an award from Communication Arts magazine for "best in entertainment interactive design". 

PC Mag described the game as "so packed with great graphics and original songs that it makes other kids titles look anemic by comparison". SuperKids also praised the graphics, describing them as "slick" and using "state-of-the-art technology". I.D. Magazine described the game as "really sophisticated" and wrote that the game was "pushing not only gaming and illustration for kids, but also advancing ideas about game-space". The game received praise from Time, who noted the game as a departure from Disney's typical releases.

Voice cast
Harry Anderson as the Graveyard Shadow/Grampa Ted Needlemeyer
Jeff Cesario as the School Shadow/Billy Blatfield
Lani Minella as Sarah Needlemeyer
Steve Coon as the Bathroom Shadow/Toilet
Jill Fischer as the Attic, Basement and Beyond Shadow/Sally
Edie McClurg as the Storytelling Dragon
Ali Wentworth as the Medical Shadow/Dr. Klutzchnik
Additional voices by Kyle Kozloff

Notes

References

External links

Nightmare Ned at Don Markstein's Toonopedia. Archived from the original on March 28, 2016.

1990s American animated television series
1997 American television series debuts
1997 American television series endings
1997 video games
American Broadcasting Company original programming
1990s American black comedy television series
American children's animated adventure television series
American children's animated comedy television series
American children's animated fantasy television series
American children's animated horror television series
Animated television series about children
Animated series based on video games
Television shows about nightmares
English-language television shows
Platform games
Television series by Disney Television Animation